was the founder of Dokai, the Way, a Pan-Asianist Christian-influenced new religious movement.

References

1859 births
1939 deaths